WCRC may refer to:

 WCRC (FM), a radio station in Illinois, United States
 West Coast Railways, a train company in England 
 World Communion of Reformed Churches
 Woodwell Climate Research Center, United States